Jesús Ochoa (born 12 October 1981) is a Mexican professional footballer who currently plays for Los Angeles Blues 23 in the USL Premier Development League.

Career
Ochoa moved to the United States at a young age and was raised in Riverside, California. He then played one season of college soccer with California Baptist University before signing with A-League's Portland Timbers in 2001. In 2002, he joined the Los Angeles Galaxy of Major League Soccer, playing with the club in a limited role through 2003.

After spending 2004 with Mexican club Lagartos de Tabasco, Ochoa returned to play in the MLS in 2005 with Chivas USA. He was released by Chivas in 2006.

After playing for several years in local Los Angeles-area amateur leagues, most notably for the LA Blues, Ochoa signed to play with the Los Angeles Azul Legends in the USL Premier Development League in 2010. He played 11 games and scored 3 goals for the Legends in 2010, before moving to Los Angeles Blues 23 in 2011.

Personal
Ochoa's brother, Sammy Ochoa, has played for United States at the Under-20 level and most recently for Seattle Sounders FC.

References

External links
 

1981 births
Living people
Portland Timbers (2001–2010) players
LA Galaxy players
Lagartos de Tabasco footballers
California Baptist Lancers men's soccer players
Chivas USA players
LA Laguna FC players
OC Pateadores Blues players
Footballers from Michoacán
Mexican footballers
American sportspeople of Mexican descent
Mexican people of Basque descent
Major League Soccer players
USL League Two players
Mexican emigrants to the United States
Soccer players from California
Association football midfielders